Thomas Käslin (born 7 February 1967) is a retired Swiss football midfielder.

References

1967 births
Living people
Swiss men's footballers
FC Chiasso players
FC Lugano players
FC Lausanne-Sport players
Association football midfielders
Swiss Super League players